The Rock 'n' Roll Marathon Series is a collection of road running events owned and operated by the IRONMAN Group's Competitor Group, part of Advance Publications. The series is known for lining race routes with live bands, cheerleaders and themed water stations.

Events
There are 31 events in the Rock 'n' Roll Series spanning 9 countries.  In 2012, Competitor Group organized its first marathon outside North America when it acquired the organizing rights for the Madrid (Spain) Marathon.

Marathons and Half Marathons

Rock 'n' Roll Arizona Marathon & 1/2 Marathon – Phoenix and Tempe, Arizona and Scottsdale, Arizona
Rock 'n' Roll Beijing Half Marathon - Beijing, China
Rock 'n' Roll Cancun Marathon - Cancun, Mexico
Rock 'n' Roll Chengdu Half Marathon - Chengdu, China
Rock 'n' Roll Clearwater Half Marathon - Clearwater, Florida
Rock 'n' Roll DC Marathon & Half Marathon – Washington, D.C.
Rock 'n' Roll Guangzhou Huadu Half Marathon - Guangzhou, China
Rock 'n' Roll Las Vegas Marathon & 1/2 Marathon  – Las Vegas
Rock 'n' Roll Lima Half Marathon - Lima, Peru
Maratón de Rock ‘n’ Roll Madrid – Madrid, Spain
Rock 'n' Roll Medellin Half Marathon - Medellin, Colombia
Rock 'n' Roll Mexico City - Mexico City
Rock 'n' Roll Nashville Marathon & 1/2 Marathon – Nashville, Tennessee
Rock 'n' Roll Mardi Gras Marathon & 1/2 Marathon – New Orleans, Louisiana
Rock 'n' Roll Oaxaca Half Marathon - Oaxaca, Mexico
Rock 'n' Roll San Antonio Marathon & 1/2 Marathon – San Antonio, Texas
Rock 'n' Roll San Diego Marathon & 1/2 Marathon – San Diego, California
Rock 'n' Roll San Jose Half Marathon – San Jose, California
Rock 'n' Roll Savannah Marathon and 1/2 Marathon - Savannah, Georgia
Rock 'n' Roll Seattle Marathon & 1/2 Marathon – Seattle, Washington
Rock 'n' Roll Shanghai Chongming Half Marathon - Shanghai, China

Past Events

Rock 'n' Roll Brooklyn Half Marathon – Brooklyn, NY
Rock 'n' Roll Chicago Half Marathon – Chicago, Illinois
Rock 'n' Roll Cleveland 1/2 Marathon(2013) - Cleveland, OH
Rock 'n' Roll Dallas Half Marathon(2009-2018) – Dallas, Texas
Rock 'n' Roll Denver Marathon(2010-2015) - Denver, CO
Rock 'n' Roll Dublin Half Marathon – Dublin, Ireland
Rock ‘n’ Roll Lisbon Marathon – Lisbon, Portugal
Rock 'n' Roll Los Angeles Half Marathon – Los Angeles
Rock 'n' Roll Merida - Mérida, Yucatán
Rock 'n' Roll Miami Beach 1/2 Marathon(2011-2012) - Miami Beach, FL
Marathon Oasis de Montreal (2012-2020) – Montreal, Canada
Rock 'n' Roll New York 10K(2011-2013) - New York, NY
Rock 'n' Roll Pasadena 1/2 Marathon(2012-2013) - Pasadena, CA
Rock 'n' Roll Philadelphia Half Marathon – Philadelphia, Pennsylvania
Rock 'n' Roll Pittsburgh 1/2 Marathon(Cancelled before event) - Pittsburgh, PA
Rock 'n' Roll Providence 1/2Marathon(2011-2013) - Providence, RI
Rock 'n' Roll Portland 1/2 Marathon(2012-2015) - Portland, OR
Rock 'n' Roll Queretaro Marathon and 1/2 Marathon - Querétaro
Rock 'n' Roll Raleigh Marathon & 1/2 Marathon  – Raleigh, NC
Rock 'n' Roll San Francisco 1/2 Marathon - San Francisco
Rock 'n' Roll St. Louis Marathon & 1/2 Marathon – St. Louis, Missouri
Rock 'n' Roll St. Petersburg 1/2 Marathon(2012-2013) - St. Petersburg, Fl
Rock 'n' Roll Vancouver Half Marathon (2014-2016) - Vancouver, B.C.
Rock 'n' Roll Liverpool Marathon & 1/2 Marathon – Liverpool, England
Rock 'n' Roll Virginia Beach Half Marathon – Virginia Beach, Virginia
Rock 'n' Roll Santiago Half Marathon - Santiago, Chile

Charity controversies
In 2008, the Competitor Group took over Elite Racing, the company that had been organizing the Rock 'n' Roll Marathon. The following year, 2009, an internal audit revealed that the charity in whose name the race had been run, Elite Racing Foundation for Children, Education & Medical Research, had been improperly commingling funds with the for-profit Elite Racing. It further found that the foundation was being operated "in many instances for the benefit of the for-profit,” and that the charity's role in hosting the races had been overstated. As a result, the race had benefited improperly from hundreds of thousands of dollars in public subsidies and grants. In announcing the results of the audit, Competitor said it would return $190,500 to San Diego County and $152,544 to the city of San Diego, spend the remaining foundation funds on health and wellness causes, file amended tax returns, and dissolve the foundation. Competitor Group made the final payments in October 2009. Altogether the company returned $344,176 to the city and county.

In September 2014 Saint Louis University School of Law professor Yvette Joy Liebesman sued Competitor Group, alleging a violation of the Fair Labor Standards Act in the handling of volunteers for the October 2012 race in St. Louis. The class-action lawsuit claims the company partners with charities to create a “a veneer for recruiting free labor” but the race events are for-profit and do not serve a charitable purpose under the law. The company asked the judge to dismiss the lawsuit, but this was denied, allowing the suit to go forward.

References

External links
Official website

Marathons in the United States